In journalism, the nut graph or nut graf (short for "nutshell paragraph") is a paragraph that explains the context of the story "in a nutshell".  The term can be spelled many different ways.

In many news stories, the essential facts of a story are included in the lead, the first sentence or two of a story. Good leads try to answer who, what, when, where, why, and how as quickly as possible.

The nut graph, which often will start in the third, fourth, or fifth paragraphs, will explain any additional context for why the story is important. For example, if the news story concerns a candidate for an upcoming election, the nut graph will state when the election is and may expand upon issues of the election. If the news story is part of an ongoing story, the nut graph will likely summarize other recent events related to the newest revelations.

See also 
Sound bite

References 

Journalism terminology
Newswriting